The .50 Action Express (AE) (12.7×33mmRB) is a large-caliber handgun cartridge, best known for its usage in the Desert Eagle. Developed in 1988 by American Evan Whildin of Action Arms, the .50 AE is one of the most powerful pistol cartridges in production.

Overview
The actual cartridge has a  base, with a rebated rim. The rim diameter of the .50 AE is the same as the .44 Remington Magnum cartridge. A Mark XIX Desert Eagle in .50 AE can be converted to .44 with nothing more than a barrel and magazine change.

The introduction of the .50 AE in the United States was met with a rocky start. Federal firearms statutes state that non-sporting firearms may not be over 0.500 inches in bore diameter (measured land to land) to meet Title I regulations. The original .50 AE bore diameter was .500 in, with conventional rifling, but the switch to polygonal rifling on production Desert Eagles allowed the gauge plug to drop through, rendering the gun a destructive device under Bureau of Alcohol, Tobacco, Firearms and Explosives (BATFE) regulations. Actual bullet diameter was reduced to the current  rather than the original .510" — thus the noticeably tapered case.

Recoil of the .50 AE in the Desert Eagle pistol is substantial, although only marginally more severe than the .44 Magnum, as the automatic mechanism and weight of the gun smooth the recoil somewhat. Other firearms chambered for the .50 AE include the AMT AutoMag V, the LAR Grizzly Win Mag, the Magnum Research BFR, and the Freedoms Arms Model 555.

Performance

Use
Like other handgun cartridges of such magnitude, the principal uses of the .50 AE are metallic silhouette shooting and medium/big game hunting. Like the .44 Magnum, .454 Casull, .460 S&W Magnum, and .500 S&W Magnum, it is also well suited for defense against large predators, such as bears. With heavier bullets, such as the TII Armory 410-grain loading or the Buffalo Bore 380-grain Outdoorsman offering, the .50 AE closely matches the performance of the .480 Ruger and approaches the ballistics of the .500 Linebaugh.

The .50 AE as a parent case
The .50 AE is the parent case for the .440 Cor-Bon (1998) by Cor-Bon and the .429 DE (2018) by Magnum Research (a division of Kahr Firearms Group). Though similar, they are not interchangeable.

Images

See also
 Table of handgun and rifle cartridges

References

External links

 The Reload Bench: .50 Action Express

Magnum pistol cartridges
Pistol and rifle cartridges
Action Express cartridges